Tijovac may refer to:

 Tijovac (Kuršumlija), a village in Serbia
 Tijovac (Svrljig), a village in Serbia